Legend of the Hillbilly Butcher is an 2013 American horror film that was written and directed by Joaquin Montalvan. The film was released to DVD and VOD on 23 September 2014 and stars Paul E. Respass as a hillbilly with a taste for human flesh.

Plot

Carl Henry Jessup (Paul E. Respass) is a hillbilly that has spent his days with his half sister Rae Lynn (Theresa Holly) and best friend Billy Wayne (Chris Shumway). He's unhappy over the loss of his parents, who died in a murder-suicide, so he decides that he will plead with the demon Sam Bakoo (Allen East) to bring him back. However, as Carl has also spent much of his time indulging in cannibalism, his soul is not enough to appease Sam.

Cast
Paul E. Respass as Carl Henry Jessup
Doreen Barnes as Mama Jessup
Allen East as Sam Bakoo
S.E. Feinberg as The Storyteller
Theresa Holly as Rae Lynn
Chris Shumway as Billy Wayne

Reception
Critical reception for Legend Of The Hillbilly Butcher has been mixed. Ain't It Cool News praised the film for its "twisted imagery" and "the embrace of retro coolness by most of its cast", while DVD Talk commented that it would be a good rental film. Bloody Disgusting panned Legend Of The Hillbilly Butcher, commenting that while it "does an excellent job of establishing a Grindhouse look and feel that many low budget films fail to grasp", it "suffers with not fully embracing its concept, including its painfully slow pace."

References

External links
 
 

2013 horror films
American supernatural horror films
2013 films
Films about cannibalism
2010s English-language films
2010s American films
Films about hillbillies